The Teakettle Experimental Forest is a part of the Sierra National Forest that is set aside for research into forest ecology. The area is old-growth forest at  elevation and consists primarily of mixed-conifer and red fir forest common on the western slope of the Sierra Nevada.

The forest was established in the 1930s when California state and federal agencies began exploring how the Central Valley of California's water supply might be increased through management of Sierra Nevada watersheds. In 1938, a  area surrounding Teakettle Creek was designated the Teakettle Experimental Area and five drainages were chosen for study. Stream gauge stations and sediment basins were built in the 1940s. Research collaborators have come from the following institutions and agencies: California State University, Michigan Technological University, National Aeronautics and Space Administration-Goddard Space Flight Center, Oregon State University, University of California, Berkeley, University of California, University of Maryland, Virginia Commonwealth University, Universidad Metropolitana, University of Michigan, University of Nevada, University of Washington, USDA Forest Service, Forest Inventory and Analysis Program, Sierra National Forest, and Southern Research Station. There is a bunkhouse cabin, dry laboratory, and storage garage. The experimental forest is gated and relatively remote.

References

Protected areas of the Sierra Nevada (United States)
Forests of California
Sierra National Forest
Protected areas of Fresno County, California
Research forests
Protected areas established in 1938
1938 establishments in California